The Lanckorona Castle was built in the early 14th century in Lanckorona, Poland. It was damaged in several fires and during conflicts, especially in 1655 during the Swedish Deluge and Battle of Lanckorona in 1771.Jakub Derc led a peasant revolt and was killed in Lanckorona.

History 
As documented in the manuscripts of the chronicler and diplomat Jan Długosz, King Casimir III the Great erected the Lanckorona Castle to protect the road to Kraków and the border with the Duchy of Oświęcim.

Castle design 
The original stronghold from the Middle Ages had a rectangular shape and had two four-sided corner towers. The rectangular inner courtyard was closed-off from the northwest side of the castle by a living quarters. In the 18th century, after the castle was rebuilt, cannon bastions were located in the corners of the castle, and a drawbridge led to the main gate. In 1770, the Bar Confederation repaired and fortified the castle. With the help of French engineers, external earth fortifications were built including a tick-shaped fort.

See also 
Bar Confederation

References

Bibliography 

 Władysław Konopczyński Bar Confederation (1936) 

Castles in Lesser Poland Voivodeship
Wadowice County
History of Lesser Poland
Houses completed in the 14th century
Royal residences in Poland